...That's the Way It Is is the thirteenth album by American singer Harry Nilsson, released in 1976 on RCA Records. Aside from two original songs, the album consists of cover tunes.

The songs include "That Is All", written by George Harrison and originally released on Living in the Material World in 1973; America's "I Need You", from their eponymous 1971 album; Randy Newman's "Sail Away", from his 1972 album of the same name; and the Heartbeats' "A Thousand Miles Away". Harrison's song was recorded twice by Nilsson, to open and close the album.

Another cover version on ...That's the Way It Is, the calypso "Zombie Jamboree", had previously been recorded by Lord Intruder, Kingston Trio and Harry Belafonte, among others. Nilsson's medley of the Doris Troy hit "Just One Look" and Barbara Lewis' "Baby I'm Yours" was performed as a duet with singer Lynda Laurence. The latter, formerly of the Supremes, was the wife of Nilsson's producer, Trevor Lawrence.

Track listing

Personnel
Credits per original album cover and Allmusic:
 Harry Nilsson – vocals
 Lynda Laurence – duet vocals on "Just One Look/Baby I'm Yours", backing vocals
 Tony La Peau – guest vocals on "A Thousand Miles Away"
 Danny Kortchmar, Jesse Ed Davis, Fred Tackett, Lon & Derrek Van Eaton, Keith Allison, Dennis Budimir, Peter Jameson, John Morell, David Wolfert, Mike Anthony – guitar
 Dr. John, Van Dyke Parks, Jane Getz, David Paich, James Newton Howard – keyboards
 Malcolm Cecil – synthesizer
 Klaus Voormann – bass
 Jim Keltner, Chili Charles – drums
 Tom Collier, Gene Estes – timpani
 Robert Greenidge – steel drums
 Doug Hoefer – percussion
 Bobby Keys, Gene Cipriano, James Roberts, Buddy Collette, Joe Darensbourg, William Green, Jim Horn, Johnny Rotella - saxophone
 Andrew Blakeney, Steve Madaio, Anthony Terran – trumpet
 Vincent DeRosa, David Duke, Henry Sigismonti - French horn
 Herbie Harper, Lew McCreary, Richard Taylor "Dick" Nash, Benny Powell - trombone
 Sid Sharp, Murray Adler, Israel Baker, Arnold Belnick, Assa Drori, Henry Ferber, Ronald Folsom, James Getzoff, Harris Goldman, Edward Green, Nathan Kaproff, William Kurash, Carl LaMagna, Joy Lyle, Leonard Malarsky, Ralph Schaeffer, Paul Shure, Polly Sweeney, Tibor Zelig - violin
 Meyer Bello, Samuel Boghossian, Louis Cievman, Rollice Dale, Allan Harshman, Harry Hyams, Michael Nowak, David Schwartz - viola
 Raphael Dramer, Jesse Ehrlich, Armand Karpoff, Ray Kelley, Jerome Kessler, Harry Shlutz – cello
 Jimmy Bond, Peter Mercurio, Mickey Nadel - double bass
 Charles Gould, Melvin Tax - bassoon
 Deidra Askey, Richard Glasser, Joseph Greene, Abigale Haness, Monalisa Harrington, John Lehman, Sherlie Matthews, Bill Thedford – backing vocals
 Richie Schmitt, Tommy Vicari - engineer

Charts

References

Harry Nilsson albums
1976 albums
RCA Records albums